Okongo is a village in the Ohangwena Region of northern Namibia. It is the district capital of Okongo Constituency.

History
Okongo was first settled by the San people in the 1900s, who, as a hunter-gatherer community, found the local abundance of wildlife and fruit attractive in the village.  The name Okongo derives from the Oshiwambo word meaning: a place or a forest for hunting.

The San were eventually displaced in Okongo by the immigration of Bantu people. Today the commonly spoken language in the area is Oshiwambo and Christianity is the predominant religion.

Economy and infrastructure

Okongo has basic amenities: electricity, water and sanitation, a post office, basic supermarkets, and clothing outlets, as well as banking facilities. Okongo District Hospital, a 62-bed public hospital that serves the surrounding settlements, is situated in the village.

There are two pre-primary schools, one primary school (Okongo Primary School), a combined school (Elia Weyulu Combined School) and a secondary school (Oshela Senior Secondary School). There is a NaTIS office, registering cars, drivers, and licenses, which was initiated in 2020.

The village is accessible via a tarred road. There is also a landing strip for small aircraft.

The Women's Action for Development (WAD) group conducted a project aimed at skills transfer to local women. A total of about 120 unemployed women graduated from this program in 2010.

Politics
Okongo is governed by a village council that has five seats.

The 2015 local authority election was won by SWAPO which gained 881 votes and all five seats. The Rally for Democracy and Progress (RDP) and the Democratic Turnhalle Alliance (DTA) also ran and gained 60 and 29 votes, respectively. SWAPO also won the 2020 local authority election. It obtained 521 votes and gained four seats. The Independent Patriots for Change (IPC), an opposition party formed in August 2020, obtained 208 votes and the remaining seat.

References

Villages in Namibia
Populated places in the Ohangwena Region